In the philosophy of language and metaphysics, metasemantics is the study of the foundations of natural language semantics (the philosophical study of meaning). Metasemantics searches for "the proper understanding of compositionality, the object of truth-conditional analysis, metaphysics of reference, as well as, and most importantly, the scope of semantic theory itself" and asks "how it is that expressions become endowed with their semantic significance".

See also
 Metasyntax
 Metapragmatics

References

Semantics
Meaning (philosophy of language)